The 1941 Western Reserve Red Cats football team represented the Western Reserve University, now known as Case Western Reserve University, during the 1941 college football season. The team was coached by Tom Davies, who was assisted by Coach Ken Ormiston.  A notable star halfback was Dom "Mickey" Sanzotta, who also served as team co-captain with Paul Hudson.

The 50th game of the Case–Reserve rivalry, which began in 1891, was played.

Schedule

References

Western Reserve
Case Western Reserve Spartans football seasons
Western Reserve Red Cats football